This is a list of winners at the Nickelodeon Kids' Choice for Favorite Cartoon, given at the Nickelodeon Kids' Choice Awards. This list will also show other information and other winners and nominees that relate to that specific cartoon.

1990s

2000s

2010s

2020s

Top Winners for Favorite Cartoon

20 Wins
SpongeBob SquarePants

6 Wins
Rugrats

1 Win
Doug
The Simpsons
Avatar: The Last Airbender

Number of times each cartoon was nominated

21 Times
SpongeBob SquarePants

17 Times
The Simpsons

9 Times
Teen Titans Go!

8 Times
Rugrats (original series)
Phineas and Ferb

7 Times
The Fairly OddParents
The Loud House

6 Times
ALVINNN!!! and the Chipmunks

5 Times
Teenage Mutant Ninja Turtles (Overall franchise)

3 Times
Animaniacs
Hey Arnold!
The Amazing World of Gumball

2 Times
CatDog
Doug
Ed, Edd n Eddy
The Adventures of Jimmy Neutron, Boy Genius
The Penguins of Madagascar
Scooby-Doo! Mystery Incorporated
Adventure Time
The Boss Baby: Back in Business
Jurassic World Camp Cretaceous
The Smurfs

1 Time
Aladdin
Ace Ventura: Pet Detective
King of the Hill
Men in Black: The Series
Pokémon
The Powerpuff Girls
Scooby-Doo
Kim Possible
The Proud Family
Avatar: The Last Airbender
Kung Fu Panda: Legends of Awesomeness
Tom and Jerry
Gravity Falls
Ninjago
Steven Universe
Lego Jurassic World: Legend of Isla Nublar
Looney Tunes Cartoons
Rugrats (2021)

Bold: Won at least one time before.

References

Favorite Cartoon
American animation awards